Kenneth William Cecil Dobson (28 August 1900 – 6 March 1960) was an English cricketer. He was a right-handed batsman and a right-arm medium-pace bowler who played for Derbyshire and Warwickshire.

Dobson was born in Barrow upon Trent, Derbyshire, the son of Frederick William Dobson and his wife Agnes Eadie. He played three County Cricket matches for Derbyshire in May 1920. In the first game against Yorkshire, he was stumped for a duck in his first innings and bowled by two-time Test cricketer Abe Waddington in the second. In 1923 he played a minor counties game for Staffordshire. Finally he played two games in the 1925 season, for Warwickshire. Dobson was a tailend batsman and an occasional bowler.

Dobson died in Torquay aged 59. His uncles John Eadie and William Eadie also represented Derbyshire in County Cricket.

External links
Kenneth Dobson at Cricket Archive

1900 births
1960 deaths
English cricketers
Derbyshire cricketers
Warwickshire cricketers
Staffordshire cricketers
People from South Staffordshire District